These are the official results of the women's long jump event at the 1992 Summer Olympics in Barcelona, Spain. There were a total of 35 participating athletes and one non starter. 6.75 metres to reach final or best 12.

Medalists

Abbreviations
All results shown are in metres

Records
These were the standing world and Olympic records (in metres) prior to the 1992 Summer Olympics.

Final

Qualification
All athletes ( excluding top six ) promoted one place after drugs disqualification of Nijole Medvedeva

Note: Guthrie-Gresham, Inancsi and Staines all had three fouls, while both Bereznaya and May had one foul before withdrawing from the rest of the competition due to injury.

See also
 1990 Women's European Championships Long Jump (Split)
 1991 Women's World Championships Long Jump (Tokyo)
 1993 Women's World Championships Long Jump (Stuttgart)
 1994 Women's European Championships Long Jump (Helsinki)

References

External links
 Official Report
 Results

L
Long jump at the Olympics
1992 in women's athletics
Women's events at the 1992 Summer Olympics